Bruce Hudson is a retired American soccer forward who played professionally in the North American Soccer League.  He is the president of Hudson Global Sports Management.

Hudson attended St. Louis University where he was a member of the 1972 and 1973 NCAA Men's Division I Soccer Championship teams.  He was a 1974 First Team All American.  In September 2009, he was named to the St. Louis University Men's Soccer Half-Century Team.  He graduated in 1975 with a bachelor's degree in accounting.  In 1974 and 1975, he was part of the U.S. Olympic soccer team which was unsuccessful in its attempt to qualify for the 1976 Summer Olympics. He was on the American team at the 1975 Pan American Games. 

He was inducted into the St. Louis Soccer Hall of Fame in 2006.  In 1975, Hudson began his professional career with the Rhode Island Oceaneers of the American Soccer League.  In 1976, he moved up to the St. Louis Stars of the North American Soccer League.

From 1981 to 2008, Hudson worked as the Director of Sport Marketing for Anheuser-Busch.  After leaving Anheuser-Busch, he formed Hudson Global Sports Management of which he is the president.

References

External links
 NASL stats

1950 births
Living people
Soccer players from St. Louis
American soccer players
American Soccer League (1933–1983) players
North American Soccer League (1968–1984) players
Rhode Island Oceaneers players
St. Louis Stars (soccer) players
Saint Louis Billikens men's soccer players
All-American men's college soccer players
Association football forwards
Footballers at the 1975 Pan American Games
Pan American Games competitors for the United States